Anacampsis hirsutella is a moth of the family Gelechiidae. It is found in Austria, Switzerland, France and Italy.

The wingspan is about 14 mm.

References

Moths described in 1885
Anacampsis
Moths of Europe